The Fort railway station bombing was a suicide bombing of a commuter train while it was stopped at the Fort railway station, the main station in Colombo, Sri Lanka, on February 3, 2008. The bombing killed 12 civilians and injured more than 100. Killed in the attack were eight school children of D. S. Senanayake College's baseball team and their coach/teacher-in-charge. 

The government said that the attack was carried out by a female suicide bomber, belonging to LTTE, who got down from a train and exploded during rush hour on Platform 3.

Secretary of Defence Gotabaya Rajapaksa directed the Criminal Investigation Department to investigate the bombing which led to the arrest of two suspects alongside explosives hidden in Colombo and the discovery of small business premises run by a LTTE cell. The cell leader had left the country after the bombing.

See also 
2008 Sri Lanka bus bombings
Madhu school bus bombing

References

External links 
Heartbreak city
Sri Lanka railway station suicide blast kills 11, Reuters

 
2008 murders in Sri Lanka
21st century in Colombo
21st-century mass murder in Sri Lanka
Attacks on buildings and structures in 2008
Attacks on buildings and structures in Sri Lanka
Attacks on civilians attributed to the Liberation Tigers of Tamil Eelam
Attacks on railway stations
Massacres in Sri Lanka 
Explosions in Colombo
February 2008 crimes
February 2008 events in Asia
Liberation Tigers of Tamil Eelam attacks against trains
Liberation Tigers of Tamil Eelam attacks in Eelam War IV
Mass murder in 2008
Mass murder in Colombo
Suicide bombings in 2008
Suicide bombings in Sri Lanka
Terrorist incidents in Colombo
Terrorist incidents in Sri Lanka in 2008
Train bombings in Asia
Railway accidents in 2008